John Norman Barker (1 July 1893 – 27 October 1984) was an Australian rules footballer who played in the Victorian Football League (VFL).

Barker played one game for University in 1913, but studies took over his years as a footballer. He returned in 1917 for Fitzroy Football Club, but managed only two more VFL games. He was the younger brother of Gilbert Barker, who also played for Fitzroy and University.

References

External links

1893 births
1984 deaths
University Football Club players
Fitzroy Football Club players
Australian rules footballers from Victoria (Australia)
Australian military personnel of World War I